Pascal Lefèvre (born 25 January 1965 in Saint-Quentin) is a retired javelin thrower from France, who competed at the 1988 Summer Olympics in Seoul, South Korea, but did not reach the final. He set his personal best (82.56 m) on 28 August 1989 in Duisburg, at the Summer Universiade. Lefévre was nine times French national champion in the men's javelin event (1987–1995).

Achievements

Seasonal bests by year
1987 - 80.60
1989 - 82.56
1990 - 79.98
1991 - 77.26
1993 - 74.98
1994 - 75.20
1995 - 66.32

References

External links
  (the diacritical sign is wrong see French Wikipedia)
 sports-reference

1965 births
Living people
French male javelin throwers
Athletes (track and field) at the 1988 Summer Olympics
Olympic athletes of France
World Athletics Championships athletes for France
Universiade medalists in athletics (track and field)
Universiade silver medalists for France
People from Saint-Quentin, Aisne
Sportspeople from Aisne